The Triangulation Point Draw Site is an archeological site in Uinta County, Wyoming. The camp was occupied by Native Americans from both the Great Basin and the northwestern Plains during the Late Prehistoric period. Surface artifacts found at the site include chipped stone points and tools, ground stone tools, fire locations and organic stains. Buried artifacts include fire rings and habitation-related disturbances.

The site was listed on the National Register of Historic Places in 1986.

References

External links
 Triangulation Point Draw Site District at the Wyoming State Historic Preservation Office

Archaeological sites on the National Register of Historic Places in Wyoming
Geography of Uinta County, Wyoming
Historic districts on the National Register of Historic Places in Wyoming
National Register of Historic Places in Uinta County, Wyoming